Euro-Mir is a Space Themed spinning roller coaster located at Europa-Park in Rust, Germany. Unlike most spinning coasters, however, the cars do not spin freely, but are rotated by motors at set points during the ride. It was designed by Franz Mack and opened in 1997.

The Ride Experience is modeled on the Soviet/Russian space station Mir. It consists of five cylindrical towers, with the ride simulating a trip into space and re-entry into the Earth's atmosphere. The ride opened in 1997 and carries nine trains, each comprising four circular spinning cars. Riders are seated back to back in pairs, with a maximum of 16 riders per train.

The attraction's theming was designed by P&P Projects.

References

External links

Euro-Mir at the official Europa-Park website

Roller coasters in Germany
Roller coasters introduced in 1997
Outer space in amusement parks
Rides at Europa-Park